The Iron Age museum is a museum in Tabriz, Iran. Established in 2006, the museum is built over an iron age archaeological site. The burial site was uncovered in 1997 during the reconstruction of the nearby Blue Mosque. The Iron Age museum now contains exhibits, dig sites, and artifacts recovered from the site.

See also 
Azerbaijan Museum
Pottery Museum of Tabriz

References 

Museums in Tabriz
Archaeology of Iran
Museums established in 2006